The 1927 VMI Keydets football team was an American football team that represented the Virginia Military Institute (VMI) during the 1927 college football season as a member of the Southern Conference. In their first year under head coach W. C. Raftery, the team compiled an overall record of 6–4.

Schedule

References

VMI
VMI Keydets football seasons
VMI Keydets football